Keirsteadville is a rural community in Kings County, New Brunswick, Canada. It is located on the shore of Belleisle Bay, directly across from Springfield.

History

Notable people

See also
List of communities in New Brunswick

Communities in Kings County, New Brunswick